André Busic is a Brazilian jazz trumpeter of Croatian origin.  He partook in bands such as Traditional Jazz Band and Blue Gang, and is the father of Andria Busic and Ivan Busic.

References
 

Brazilian jazz musicians
Brazilian people of Croatian descent
Possibly living people
Year of birth missing